Romualdo Arppi Filho (7 January 1939 – 4 March 2023) was a Brazilian football referee. He is mostly known for supervising three matches in the 1986 FIFA World Cup in Mexico, including the final rival between Germany and Argentina. Argentina eventually won the game 3–2. He was the second successive Brazilian to referee a World Cup final.

References

External links 
 Profile

Romualdo Arppi Filho

1939 births
2023 deaths
People from Santos, São Paulo
Brazilian football referees
FIFA World Cup referees
FIFA World Cup Final match officials
1986 FIFA World Cup referees
Olympic football referees
Football referees at the 1980 Summer Olympics